The Forstlicher Versuchsgarten Grafrath is an arboretum in Grafrath, Bavaria, Germany.

The arboretum is located at Jesenwanger Strasse 11, Grafrath. It is  large. It is open without charge on weekdays in the warmer months. It was established in 1881, and since 1995 has been maintained by the Bayerische Landesanstalt für Wald und Forstwirtschaft (LWF). It contains over 200 species of foreign trees and shrubs from the Americas, Asia, and Europe.

See also 
 List of botanical gardens in Germany

External links 
 website
 Brochure with map
 Verwaltungsgemeinschaft Grafrath
 Bayerisches Staatsministerium für Ernährung, Landwirtschaft und Forsten
 Photographs

Grafrath, Forstlicher Versuchsgarten
Grafrath, Forstlicher Versuchsgarten
Fürstenfeldbruck (district)